The Schlenze is a river in Saxony-Anhalt, Germany. It is a left-bank tributary of the Saale.

See also

List of rivers of Saxony-Anhalt

Rivers of Saxony-Anhalt
Rivers of Germany